This is a list of the Australian moth species of the family Heliodinidae. It also acts as an index to the species articles and forms part of the full List of moths of Australia.

Epicroesa ambrosia Meyrick, 1907
Epicroesa metallifera Meyrick, 1907
Epicroesa thiasarca Meyrick, 1907
Heliodines princeps Meyrick, 1906

External links 
Heliodinidae at Australian Faunal Directory

Australia